The Turks Islands skink (Spondylurus turksae) is a species of skink found in the Turks and Caicos Islands.

References

Spondylurus
Reptiles described in 2012
Reptiles of the Caribbean
Endemic fauna of the Caribbean
Taxa named by Stephen Blair Hedges
Taxa named by Caitlin E. Conn